The 1970–71 AHL season was the 35th season of the American Hockey League. Eight teams played 72 games each in the schedule.  The Baltimore Clippers finished first overall in the regular season. The Springfield Kings won their first Calder Cup championship, since being renamed from the Indians.

Team changes
 The Buffalo Bisons cease operations, when the Buffalo Sabres joined the National Hockey League as an expansion team.

Final standings
Note: GP = Games played; W = Wins; L = Losses; T = Ties; GF = Goals for; GA = Goals against; Pts = Points;

†The Springfield Kings defeated the Quebec Aces by a score of 4-3 in overtime in a one game playoff to determine the last playoff spot in the East Division.

Scoring leaders

Note: GP = Games played; G = Goals; A = Assists; Pts = Points; PIM = Penalty minutes

 complete list

Calder Cup playoffs
Tiebreaker
Springfield Kings defeated Quebec Aces 4-3 in overtime.
First round
Providence Reds defeated Baltimore Clippers 4 games to 2.
Springfield Kings defeated Montreal Voyageurs 3 games to 0.
Cleveland Barons defeated Hershey Bears 3 games to 1.
Second round
Providence Reds earned second round bye.
Springfield Kings defeated Cleveland Barons 3 games to 1.
Finals
Springfield Kings defeated Providence Reds 4 games to 0, to win the Calder Cup. 
 list of scores

Trophy and award winners
Team awards

Individual awards

Other awards

See also
List of AHL seasons

References
AHL official site
AHL Hall of Fame
HockeyDB

American Hockey League seasons
2
2